The National Employment Savings Trust (Nest) is a defined contribution workplace pension scheme in the United Kingdom. It was set up to facilitate automatic enrolment as part of the government's workplace pension reforms under the Pensions Act 2008. Due to its public service obligation, any UK employer can use Nest to meet its new workplace duties as set out in the Pensions Act 2008.

The Pensions Act 2008 established new duties which stated that employers need to provide their UK workers with access to a workplace pension plan that meets certain minimum standards. Some workers will be automatically enrolled into the pension plan and others can ask to join. The former is called 'automatic enrolment'. These reforms affect the majority of UK employers and are intended to help up to 11 million more people save for retirement.

National Employment Savings Trust (Nest) is one of the qualifying pension schemes that employers can use to meet their new duties. It was set up as part of the government's workplace pension reforms. Nest is a trust-based defined contribution pension scheme, run by a trustee (Nest Corporation) on a not-for-profit basis. In April 2014 Nest Corporation announced that it had over 1 million members saving in the scheme.

Charges

Nest is free for employers to use. Members pay a 1.8% charge on contributions plus a 0.3% annual management charge (AMC) on their total pot. Together, the charges are broadly equivalent to a 0.5% AMC for most types of saver. In March 2014 the government announced it plans to apply a charge cap of 0.75% of funds under management on default funds of DC qualifying pension schemes from April 2015. As of June 2021 there is no mention of any cap on charges in the official Nest website.

Contributions 
The National Employment Savings Trust used to have an annual contribution limit. It was reviewed annually and was £4,900 for the 2016/17 tax year. It also had restrictions on transfers in and out of the scheme. In July 2013, The Department for Work and Pensions (DWP) announced that it planned to legislate to lift the restrictions on Nest (the annual contribution limit and restrictions on transfers) from April 2017 and indicated that the restrictions on individual transfers might be lifted earlier when the 'pot follows member' arrangements in the Pensions Bill 2013/2014 were introduced.

Minimum contribution 
As of June 2021, there is a minimum contribution limit of 8% of "qualifying earnings", paid collectively by the employee and the employer. Qualifying earnings are a section of a worker's pay. For the 2021/22 tax year this is everything over £6,240 and up to £50,270. The qualifying earnings band is reviewed by the government each year.

Maximum contribution 
As of June 2021, there is no maximum contribution limit.

Transfers in 
As of June 2021, transfers into Nest are allowed.

Transferring out 
As of June 2021, transfers out of Nest are allowed.

Investment approach
Members who are automatically enrolled into Nest are put into a Nest Retirement Date Fund. The NEST Retirement Date Funds are managed according to the life stage of members in them. Members can change funds at any time after enrolment if they want to. Nest also has a small number of other fund choices.

Establishment

Proposed by the Labour Government in a May 2006 white paper; the infrastructure for Nest was established through the Pensions Act 2008.

The creation of Nest—originally known as "Personal Accounts", was one of the recommendations of The Second Report of the Pensions Commission – A New Pensions Settlement for the Twenty-First Century (2006) under the chairmanship of Adair Turner.

The Pensions Act 2007 established a transitional body, the Personal Accounts Delivery Authority (PADA) to advise on the implementation and launch of Personal Accounts. PADA consulted on various aspects of the final scheme before passing these responsibilities to Nest Corporation, the trustee of Nest.

The current Chair of Nest Corporation is Otto Thoresen. NEST Corporation's chief executive is Helen Dean.

See also
Minimum employer contribution
Pensions in the United Kingdom
Canada Pension Plan
Pensions in the United States
UK labour law
Basic state pension
KiwiSaver
The People's Pension

Notes

References
 http://www.dwp.gov.uk/docs/pensionsbillimpactassessment-final2.pdf – this is the impact assessment released in December 2007 for the Pension Bill 2008. It provides a complete appraisal of the reforms. There are also fact sheets on reactions from individuals and employers which have implications for the UK pension industry.
 http://research.dwp.gov.uk/asd/asd5/rports2009-2010/rrep558.pdf – Research document 4
 http://www.ifs.org.uk/publications/4386 – IFS PowerPoint presentation discussing the adequacy of these reforms
 http://www.ifs.org.uk/pr/personal_accounts.pdf – IFS press release
 http://news.bbc.co.uk/1/hi/business/8101097.stm – BBC – Personal account benefit 'small'
 http://www.retirementmadesimpler.org/Library/The%20Power%20of%20Suggestion-%20Inertia%20in%20401(k).pdf – THE POWER OF SUGGESTION: INERTIA IN 401(k)PARTICIPATION AND SAVINGS BEHAVIOR* – Brigitte C. Madrian AND DENNIS F. SHEA

External links
NEST Corporation official website
https://www.gov.uk/browse/working/workplace-personal-pensions – UK Government website 
Explanation of known NEST defect with postal addressing
Pensions Policy Institute – publishing independent non-political research into UK pensions policy.
Association of Member-Directed Pension Schemes (AMPS) – The principal body for discussing changes involving self-administered pension schemes
Aon Hewitt United Kingdom – Definition of Auto Enrollment  
The People's Pension –

Pensions in the United Kingdom
Department for Work and Pensions
Statutory corporations of the United Kingdom government